The 2014 MENA Golf Tour was the fourth season of the MENA Golf Tour.

Schedule
The following table lists official events during the 2014 season.

Order of Merit
The Order of Merit was based on prize money won during the season, calculated in U.S. dollars. James Allan led the amateur Order of Merit.

Notes

References

MENA Golf Tour